ZOC may refer to:

 Zimbabwe Olympic Committee
 Zionist Organization of Canada, Zionist organization
 Zirconium oxychloride, or Zirconyl chloride, inorganic compound
 ZOC (software), an ssh/telnet client and software terminal emulator
 ZOC (band), a Japanese idol girl group
 Zone of control, the tiles adjacent to tiles occupied by objects in board wargames
zoc, the ISO 639 code for  Copainalá Zoque dialect, southern Mexico